Sergey Ivanovich Lomanov (born 22 May 1957 in Krasnoyarsk) is a Russian bandy manager and former player (forward). He made 183 goals for the Soviet Union national bandy team. He played his club bandy for Yenisey Krasnoyarsk and IK Sirius.

He is the father of Sergey Sergeyevich Lomanov.

References

Russian bandy players
Yenisey Krasnoyarsk players
IK Sirius players
Expatriate bandy players in Sweden
Russian Bandy Super League players
Soviet bandy players
1957 births
Living people